Moddershall is a small village in the borough of Stafford in the county of Staffordshire, England, part of the civil parish of Stone Rural and ecclesiastical parish of Oulton with Moddershall. Lying to the East of the River Trent, it is roughly halfway between the city of Stoke-on-Trent and the small town of Stone.

Moddershall Valley
The geography of the area is defined by the Scotch Brook, which after rising close to All Saints Church to the north of the village, runs round from the east of the village, then westwards and down towards its confluence with the River Trent.

History

Moddershall village is mentioned in Domesday Book, listed as Modders Hale. During the 10th century, farming was the main activity, with the local reddish-brown clay being used to create suitable building bricks, topped with slate roofs.

Although not as important as the forges and watermills of the Churnet Valley which had seven flint-grinding mills (two at Cheddleton, three at Consall and two at Frogall), the Moddershall Valley is best known and resultantly conserved as an early industrial revolution site, due to the number of watermills within the valley. To be legally allowed to extract water from the area, the miller would need to gain the permission of the Lord of the Land, which for the manor of Moddershall Valley was controlled from Butterton, by the Lords of Stafford at Swynnerton Hall.

It is likely that corn mills existed in the valley from the 12th century, and evidence exists to show numerous mills during the Middle Ages. But it was not until 1720 that local potter John Astbury of Shelton discovered that adding heated and ground flint powder to the local reddish clay could create a more palatable white or cream ware, that sold at higher volumes to the natural Staffordshire Potteries reddish colour. The flint was sourced from either the South Coast of England or France, and then shipped to the Port of Liverpool or Shardlow, near Derby on the River Trent.

However, the grinding process produced a fine siliceous dust, that after adhering to the workers lungs resulted in cases of silicosis, similar to the condition of pneumoconiosis suffered by coal miners. The result was that workers tried to do any work but flint grinding. Resultantly, in the early 1900s four mills in the valley converted to grinding bone, which had a similar effect.

By the late 1930s the mills were in decline, and a shortage of skilled manpower and cheap supply product, meant that after World War II the mills began to close. By the 1970s, only Hayes and Ivy mills were in operation, although their water wheels were out of operation and the grinding mechanism was powered by electricity. The closure of Hayes Mill in 1977 brought to an end 250 years of milling in the valley.

Present
All Saints' Church was built from local stone in 1903/4 by three daughters of Hensleigh Wedgwood including Frances Julia Wedgwood.  It was completely taken down and re-erected on new foundations in 1993/94 following subsidence damage from nearby Florence Colliery.  According to the 2001 UK census, the population of the civil parish (of which Moddershall is only one ward) was 947. The entire Moddershall Valley is now part of a designated Conservation Area.

Governance
For administrative purposes Moddershall forms part of Stone Rural civil parish which, in turn, forms part of the borough of Stafford.

Watermills in the Moddershall Valley

See also
Cheddleton Flint Mill
Meir

References

External links

Moddershall on ThePotteries.org

Villages in Staffordshire
Borough of Stafford
Staffordshire pottery